Jampruca is a genus of beetles in the family Cerambycidae, containing the following species:

 Jampruca nigricornis Napp & Martins, 1982
 Jampruca tyligma Napp & Martins, 1982

References

Elaphidiini
Cerambycidae genera